Falmouth Rugby Football Club is a rugby union club based in the town of Falmouth, Cornwall, in the United Kingdom, playing in Western Counties West at the seventh tier of the English league system, following promotion from the Tribute Cornwall/Devon league at the end of the 2016–17 season. The club play at the Recreation Ground.  They enjoy a rivalry with close neighbours, Penryn.

History
Founded in 1873, Falmouth have produced two players who have been capped by the England national team: E J "John" Jackett and Jim George. Jackett played thirteen times for England making his debut on 2 December 1905 against New Zealand at Crystal Palace. He also toured with the British Lions to New Zealand and Australia in 1908. Jim George made his debut against Scotland on 15 March 1947 and played a further two matches against France and Ireland. On 24 November 1926 Cornwall played what was considered the best ever New Zealand Māori rugby union team at Falmouth, with Cornwall winning 6–3.

During the 1970s the club had a relatively successful spell when they were considered one of the best sides in the county, winning the Cornwall Cup twice as well as finishing top of the Cornwall Merit Table in 1977. When league rugby was introduced in 1987, Falmouth were placed in the Cornwall/Devon League, at tier 8 of the English rugby union system. Following the club's relegation at the end of the 1989–90 they spent much of the next decade playing in Cornwall League 1. A second promotion from Cornwall League 1 early on in the 21st century, saw Falmouth consolidate its position in the Cornwall/Devon League, with fourteen uninterrupted seasons in tier 8. At the end of the 2017–18 season Falmouth won the Cornwall/Devon league title and with it promotion to Western Counties West, the highest level the club had reached so far in its history.

Season summary

 First team

 Falmouth Albion Reserves

 Falmouth One and All

Honours
 Cornwall Club Champions: 1899–1900 
 Cornwall Cup winners (2): 1973–74, 1976–77
 CRFU Official Merit Table champions: 1976–77
 Cornwall Clubs Cup winners (2): 1991–92, 2002–03
 Cornwall League 1 champions (2): 1996–97, 2002–03
 Tribute Cornwall/Devon champions: 2016–17

Current season
 See Western Counties West

Notes

See also
 Cornish rugby

References

External links
 Official club website

Cornish rugby union teams
Rugby clubs established in 1873
Sports clubs in Cornwall
Falmouth, Cornwall